The Cajamarca antpitta (Grallaria cajamarcae) is a species of bird in the family Grallariidae. It is endemic to Peru. It is a member of the rufous antpitta species complex and was formally elevated from subspecies to species in 2020.

Taxonomy
The Cajamarca antpitta was described as a subspecies by Chapman in 1927, but a 2020 study found that its vocal characteristics, distinct plumage and mitochondrial genetic differences warrant its elevation to species. 

The Cajamarca antpitta is named after Cajamarca, the department that contains the majority of the species' range. Its specific name, cajamarcae, is also named for the region.

Distribution and habitat
The Cajamarca antpitta is endemic to the north-western Peruvian Andes, and west of the Marañón River. It is only found in three departments: Cajamarca, Piura and Lambayeque. It is found at elevations of 2850–3400 m.  It inhabits humid montane forests and forest edges; it prefers the understory and forest floor. It is most commonly seen near the city of Cajamarca, the capital of the Cajamarca region and can also be found in the Pagaibamba Protection Forest. 

The Marañón and Huancabamba rivers separate the Cajamarca antpitta from the closely related Equatorial antpitta.

References

Grallaria
Endemic fauna of Peru
Birds of Peru